Magomedkhan Amanulayevich Gamzatkhanov (born April 15, 1961),
is a Russian retired mixed martial artist, professional wrestler, sambo wrestler and former military officer of Avar descent. Gamzatkhanov is better known by his ringname Volk Han and is renowned for his technical mastery of sambo.

Gamzatkhanov represented Russia on the Russian Fighting Network RINGS team with Fedor Emelianenko, Andrei Kopylov, Nikolai Zouev and Mikhail Ilyukhin. In the early 1990s Han opened his own martial arts academy, which taught a derivative of combat sambo with special emphasis on flying and spinning joint locks and compression locks applied to upper and lower extremities.

During his tenure in RINGS, Han was considered the promotion's top foreign star and impacted the popularity of martial art Sambo's popularity in Japan. According to MMA ranking system portal Fight Matrix, Magomedkhan Gamzatkhanov was ranked the #10 Heavyweight of 1997.

Sambo career
Magomedkhan was born on April 15, 1961, in the village in the Anchik, Akhvakhsky District of the Dagestan Autonomous Soviet Socialist Republic. He is of Karata ethnicity and was the third child in the family.

Gamzatkhanov started training freestyle wrestling while at college. After learning in several teams, his friend Ahmed Sharipov introduced him to the five-time world champion Ali Aliyev, who accepted to train him. Under his tutelage, Gamzatkhanov won the Nalchik regional championship in 1979. He also won the USSR junior championship two years back to back, and placed fourth in the international Aliyev Cup. In 1981, upon beginning his two-year service in the USSR military, Han decided to leave wrestling for sambo, and was immediately scouted by Viktor Lysenko for his team in Tula.

In 1984, Gamzatkhanov attended the Police Academy in Moscow. A year later, he competed in the USSR sambo championship and placed second after losing in the finals to the legendary Alexander Pushnitsa. However, he bounced back by winning the gold medal at the openweight division in 1985, as well as the first place in the USSR championships of 1987 and 1988. He also won the Kalinin international tournament, reserved to the highest practitioners of the sport. In 1991, Gamzatkhanov returned to the USSR championship, but he was again eliminated from the finals, this time by Murat Khasanov.

The same year, he was scouted by Akira Maeda for his professional wrestling promotion Fighting Network RINGS, where he was given the ring name of Volk Han ("Volk" meaning "wolf" and "Han" being short for Magomedkhan).

Professional wrestling career
In 1991, shortly after the launch of the Japanese martial arts group "Rings", he was scouted by Akira Maeda, the presiding officer, and made his debut in Japan at the 4th Rings tournament held on December 7, the same year. In 1992, Han participated in RINGS's Mega Battle Tournament, but he was eliminated on the first round by Akira Maeda. Despite his loss, the match turned him into an instant fan favourite thanks to his spectacular grappling techniques and merry charisma, which saw him becoming one of RINGS's main players. In particular, the speed of drawing into the technique in an instant from the unique interval of the heyday and the high accuracy of the technique made the name as a "rare immovable technician".

In addition to the "Russian wolf" associated with his ring name, he was nicknamed "Magician" because of his unique appearance and submission that was described as "like a magic trick." However, he is also good at magic tricks, and when he appeared in a promotion for "Waratte Iitomo!", He showed himself magic tricks. Other than that, outside the ring, he makes jokes and invites laughter to reporters, showing a different side from the image that seems to be cold in the ring.

The next year, after several wins against names like Chris Dolman, Mitsuya Nagai and Willie Williams, Han took part in the next edition, eliminating Masayuki Naruse in the opening round before falling to teammate Nikolai Zouev in the second. Han and Zouev started a heated feud focused around their sambo backgrounds, and it saw Zouev besting Han again in a special sambo jacket match. 1994 was Han's breakout year, as he won the next edition of the Mega Battle Tournament by submitting Williams, Maeda and Hans Nijman, as well as getting his revenge against Zouev in a singles match.

After a lesser but notable participation in the 1995 tournament, in which he was eliminated by Maeda in the semifinals, Han won the 1996 iteration by defeating Naruse, Tsuyoshi Kohsaka, Tariel Bitsadze and Kiyoshi Tamura. Following an elimination from the 1996 to hands of his own apprentice, Mikhail Illyukhin, Han gave his last great tournament participation in the 1999 edition, which was fought in team format. His team, composed by RINGS Russia members Illyukhin, Sergei Sousserov and Han himself, was pitted against RINGS Holland, formed by Joop Kasteel, Hans Nijman and Dick Vrij. Despite their effort, RINGS Russia was eliminated. Han's last professional wrestling match in RINGS was in 2001, facing legendary catch wrestling expert Yoshiaki Fujiwara in a special match that ended in a draw.

Mixed martial arts career
After years competing in shoot style professional wrestling, Han switched to mixed martial arts when RINGS adopted the King of Kings (KOK) format in 1999, thus fully transitioning to an MMA promotion. By this time, Han was considered past his athletic prime. Despite this, Han amassed an impressive 8-1 record under RINGS KOK rules.

Following a winning debut against RINGS rookie Yasuhito Namekawa, Volk's skills were proven further against American wrestler and Mark Coleman's teammate Branden Lee Hinkle, 12 years his junior. Although Hinkle was able to take Han down and control him, the Russian grappler locked a tight triangle armbar at the end of the first round and made him tap out. Han got a matchup closer in age and experience against Olympic freestyle alumni Zaza Tkeshelashvili in a special Russia vs Georgia fight, but again Han won by submission with a guillotine choke.

In December, Han took part in the King of Kings tournament, where he was pitted in the first round against RINGS England leader Lee Hasdell. The Russian took him down and landed effective strikes before securing position, and also attempted triangle chokes and armbars, but Hasdell's defense was strong. Han resumed using unorthodox ground and pound from the knee-on-stomach position every time the fight hit the ground, but it was in a standing segment where he got the finish, overpowering the British kickboxer with combinations and injuring Hasdell's eye for a TKO victory. In the second round, Volk fought Bobby Hoffman, who came to the bout with a 23–4 record. Hoffman controlled Han for the majority of the fight and tried to perform ground and pound, while Han worked in avoiding damage from the bottom. However, once in overtime, Han took Hoffman down in the corner and stood over him landing punches until the end of the time, winning the decision.

During the semifinals, Han met young star Antônio Rodrigo Nogueira, expert in Brazilian jiu-jitsu and almost half of Volk's age. Despite his disadvantages, the Russian grappler was successful in stopping Nogueira from attempting submissions, even although Nogueira passed his guard and took his back at the end of the first round. When the second round arrived, Han sprawled a takedown and gained his signature knee-on-stomach control, with the Brazilian coming back with a kneebar; the hold was completely extended, but Volk shockingly escaped. After a restart, Han came attacking with a flying Kimura lock which Nogueira answered with an omoplata/ankle hold combination, but he was unable to submit Volk, and the match ended shortly after. Nogueira was given the unanimous decision, eliminating Han from the tournament.

He has been out of competition since February 2002, but will return at the Lithuanian Bushido Association (Lithuania Bushido) convention on November 20, 2004. When Sergei Kharitonov participated in HERO'S on September 17, 2007, he participated as Han's team (CLUB VOLK HAN), and Han himself came to Japan.

Martial arts instruction
Volk Han has served as the head instructor of the Russian Top Ten team for years, alongside Andrei Kopylov, and has coached names like Fedor and Alexander Emelianenko, Sergei Kharitonov, Karimula Barkalaev and two-time world sambo champion Suren Balachinskiy. After the departure of Fedor from RTT, it became public that Han was no longer on good terms with him, although Emelianenko still considers him one of the best in his field

After martial arts competition

Other than martial arts, he ran for parliamentary elections in his home country without success. After that, the Russian media was crowded with scandals related to his business.

He also helped in building a mosque in his homeland, the Republic of Dagestan, with the fight money he earned from his RINGS career.

He has been away from the competition since February 2002, but made a brief return at the Lithuanian Bushido Association (Lithuania Bushido) tournament on November 20, 2004.

Currently, he runs a martial arts dojo in his home-town of Tula.

His son, Dzhamal Gamzatkhanov, is a judoka and ranked third in the 2018 World Junior 100 kg class.

In popular culture
Volk Han is credited into bringing martial art Sambo into Japanese popular consciousness. In fighting games, Volk Han's brand of Command Sambo or Commando Sambo is used by various fictional characters, including Blue Mary from SNK's Fatal Fury and King of Fighters series, Bayman from Dead or Alive series.

Volk Han himself has become a model for many fictitious sambo practitioners in popular media, including Heizo Onikawa from the manga "Tough", Wolf from video game "Battle K-Road" and Preston Ajax from video game Fighting Layer.

Championships and accomplishments
Fighting Network Rings
1994 Mega Battle Tournament Winner
1996 Mega Battle Tournament Winner
1995 Mega Battle Tournament Semi-Finalist
1997 Mega Battle Tournament Semi-Finalist
Pro Wrestling Illustrated
PWI ranked him #129 of the top 500 singles wrestlers of the "PWI Years" in 2003
 Fight Matrix
 Highest Quarterly Ranking: 7/01/1997, #6 Heavyweight

Mixed martial arts record
Volk Han's Mixed Martial Arts record.

|-
| Draw
| align=center| 22–8–1
| Masakatsu Funaki
| Draw (majority)
| Rings/The Outsider: Volk Han Retirement Match
| 
| align=center| 1
| align=center| 15:00
| Tokyo, Japan
| Retirement match.
|-
| Win
| align=center| 22–8
| Zaza Tkeshelashvili
| Submission (armlock)
| Rings Lithuania: Bushido Rings 2
| 
| align=center| 1
| align=center| N/A
| Vilnius, Lithuania
| RINGS KOK Rules
|-
| Win
| align=center| 21–8
| Andrei Kopylov
| Decision (unanimous)
| Rings Russia: Russia vs. Bulgaria
| 
| align=center| 2
| align=center| 5:00
| Ekaterinburg, Russia
| RINGS KOK Rules
|-
| Loss
| align=center| 20–8
| Antônio Rodrigo Nogueira
| Decision (unanimous)
| Rings: King of Kings 2000 Final
| 
| align=center| 2
| align=center| 5:00
| Tokyo, Japan
| RINGS KOK Rules
|-
| Win
| align=center| 20–7
| Bobby Hoffman
| Decision (unanimous)
| Rings: King of Kings 2000 Block B
| 
| align=center| 3
| align=center| 5:00
| Osaka, Japan
| RINGS KOK Rules
|-
| Win
| align=center| 19–7
| Lee Hasdell
| TKO (punches)
| Rings: King of Kings 2000 Block B
| 
| align=center| 2
| align=center| 0:08
| Osaka, Japan
| RINGS KOK Rules
|-
| Win
| align=center| 18–7
| Zaza Tkeshelashvili
| Submission (guillotine choke)
| Rings: Russia vs. Georgia
| 
| align=center| 1
| align=center| 15:46
| Tula, Russia
| RINGS KOK Rules
|-
| Win
| align=center| 17–7
| Branden Lee Hinkle
| Submission (triangle armbar)
| Rings: Millennium Combine 2
| 
| align=center| 1
| align=center| 8:11
| Tokyo, Japan
| RINGS KOK Rules
|-
| Win
| align=center| 16–7
| Cvetko Cvetkov
| Submission (achilles lock)
| Rings Russia: Russia vs. Bulgaria
| 
| align=center| 1
| align=center| N/A
| Tula, Russia
| RINGS KOK Rules
|-
| Win
| align=center| 15–7
| Yasuhito Namekawa
| Decision (unanimous)
| Rings Russia: Russia vs. The World
| 
| align=center| 3
| align=center| 5:00
| Yekaterinburg, Russia
| RINGS KOK Rules
|-
| Loss
| align=center| 14–7
| Zaza Tkeshelashvili
| KO
| Rings: Rings Georgia
| 
| align=center| 1
| align=center| 7:08
| Georgia (country)
| 
|-
| Loss
| align=center| 14–6
| Zaza Tkeshelashvili
| Decision (unanimous)
| Rings: Rise 4th
| 
| align=center| 3
| align=center| 10:00
| Japan
| 
|-
| Win
| align=center| 14–5
| Masayuki Naruse
| Submission (armbar)
| Rings: Rise 3rd
| 
| align=center| 1
| align=center| 4:26
| Japan
| 
|-
| Win
| align=center| 13–5
| Nikolai Zuyev
| Submission (arm-triangle choke)
| Rings: Final Capture
| 
| align=center| 1
| align=center| 4:49
| Japan
| 
|-
| Loss
| align=center| 12–5
| Tsuyoshi Kohsaka
| Submission (injury)
| Rings: Third Fighting Integration
| 
| align=center| 1
| align=center| 10:10
| Tokyo, Japan
| 
|-
| Loss
| align=center| 12–4
| Akira Maeda
| Submission (verbal)
| Rings: Battle Dimensions Tournament 1997 Final
| 
| align=center| 1
| align=center| 4:24
| N/A
| 
|-
| Loss
| align=center| 12–3
| Mikhail Ilyukhin
| align=center| N/A
| Rings: Battle Dimensions Tournament 1997 Final
| 
| align=center| N/A
| align=center| N/A
| align=center| N/A
| 
|-
| Win
| align=center| 12–2
| Dick Vrij
| align=center| N/A
| Rings: Battle Dimensions Tournament 1997 Final
| 
| align=center| N/A
| align=center| N/A
| align=center| N/A
| 
|-
| Win
| align=center| 11–2
| Andrei Kopylov
| Submission (armlock)
| Rings – Mega Battle Tournament 1997 Semifinal 1
| 
| align=center| 1
| align=center| 10:52
| Japan
| 
|-
| Loss
| align=center| 10–2
| Kiyoshi Tamura
| Submission (armbar)
| Rings – Extension Fighting 7
| 
| align=center| 1
| align=center| 12:48
| Japan
| 
|-
| Win
| align=center| 10–1
| Akira Maeda
| Submission (kneebar)
| Rings – Extension Fighting 2
| 
| align=center| 1
| align=center| 8:47
| Japan
| 
|-
| Win
| align=center| 9–1
| Kiyoshi Tamura
| align=center| N/A
| Rings – Budokan Hall 1997
| 
| align=center| N/A
| align=center| N/A
| Tokyo, Japan
| 
|-
| Win
| align=center| 8–1
| Kiyoshi Tamura
| align=center| N/A
| Rings – Battle Dimensions Tournament 1996 Final
| 
| align=center| N/A
| align=center| N/A
| align=center| N/A
| 
|-
| Win
| align=center| 7–1
| Tariel Bitsadze
| align=center| N/A
| Rings – Battle Dimensions Tournament 1996 Final
| 
| align=center| N/A
| align=center| N/A
| align=center| N/A
| 
|-
| Win
| align=center| 6–1
| Tsuyoshi Kohsaka
| align=center| N/A
| Rings – Battle Dimensions Tournament 1996 Final
| 
| align=center| N/A
| align=center| N/A
| align=center| N/A
| 
|-
| Win
| align=center| 5–1
| Masayuki Naruse
| align=center| N/A
| Rings – Battle Dimensions Tournament 1996 Opening Round
| 
| align=center| N/A
| align=center| N/A
| align=center| N/A
| 
|-
| Win
| align=center| 4–1
| Tsuyoshi Kohsaka
| Submission (armbar)
| Rings – Maelstrom 6
| 
| align=center| 1
| align=center| 13:52
| Japan
| 
|-
| Win
| align=center| 3-1
| Mitsuya Nagai
| Submission (rear naked choke)
| Rings - Maelstrom 4
| 
| align=center| 1
| align=center| 11:47
| Tokyo, Japan
|
|-
| Loss
| align=center| 2–1
| Hans Nijman
| TKO
| Rings – Budokan Hall 1996
| 
| align=center| N/A
| align=center| N/A
| Tokyo, Japan
| 
|-
| Win
| align=center| 2–0
| Peter Ura
| align=center| Submission (kneebar)
| Rings – Battle Dimensions Tournament 1995 Opening Round
| 
| align=center| N/A
| align=center| N/A
| align=center| N/A
| 
|-
| Win
| align=center| 1–0
| Akira Maeda
| Submission
| Rings – Budokan Hall 1995
| 
| align=center| N/A
| align=center| N/A
| Tokyo, Japan
|

Notes

References

External links
 Magomedkhan Gamzatkhanov's MMA record on Fight Matrix
 
 Volk Han's MMA record at ESPN (incomplete)
 

1961 births
Living people
Dagestani mixed martial artists
Heavyweight mixed martial artists
Russian male sport wrestlers
Russian sambo practitioners
Russian Muay Thai practitioners
Russian male professional wrestlers
Russian male mixed martial artists
Mixed martial arts trainers
Russian Muslims
Mixed martial artists utilizing sambo
Mixed martial artists utilizing catch wrestling
Mixed martial artists utilizing Muay Thai